The Secular Student Alliance (SSA) is an American educational nonprofit organization whose purpose is to educate high school and college students about the value of scientific reason and the intellectual basis of secularism in its atheistic and humanistic manifestations. The SSA also offers these students and their organizations a variety of resources, including leadership training and support, guest speakers, discounted literature and conference tickets, and online articles and opinions.

History
In 1999, the students on the Executive Council of the Campus Freethought Alliance, along with some other students, faculty advisers, and off-campus supporters, decided that a national student organization needed autonomy (the Campus Freethought Alliance was governed by the Council for Secular Humanism). Therefore, in April 2000, a majority of the members of the Campus Freethought Alliance Executive Council decided to become independent from the Council for Secular Humanism. The Secular Student Alliance was thus founded in May 2000 by eight student leaders from the grassroots secular movement. It was organized under the nonprofit corporation laws of the State of Ohio on November 21, 2001. The corporation's principal office is located in Columbus, Ohio.

The SSA is an independent, democratically structured organization in the U.S. that promotes freethinking high school and college students. The SSA was formed "to organize, unite, educate and serve students and student communities that promote the ideals of scientific and critical inquiry, democracy, secularism, and human based ethics".

In January 2012, the SSA had over 312 affiliates in North America and abroad, including groups in Africa, Europe, Asia and Australia.

In June 2013 the SSA announced that with the Freedom from Religion Foundation, it will work on educating students on their rights and will assist with rectifying violations.

The SSA is a founding member of the Secular Coalition for America.

In October 2015 SSA tweeted that it "desperately" needed $100,000 by the end of the month. Executive director August Brunsman said fundraising had lagged.

Shortly after the hiring of new Executive Director Kevin Bolling, in October 2017 the organization relocated from Columbus, Ohio to Los Angeles.

Membership growth
The SSA has experienced increasing membership growth since its founding. As of May 2018, the SSA's Board of Directors has twelve members. The number of SSA community college and university campus affiliates has expanded considerably in recent years:
 2007 – 80 groups
 2008 – 100 groups
 2009 – 159 groups
 2010 – 219 groups
 2011 – 240 groups
 2012 – 413 groups
 2013 – 407 groups
 2018 – 276 groups
 2019 – 312 groups

Events

On August 7, 2009, the SSA organized a trip to the Creation Museum in Petersburg, Kentucky. 304 students, atheists, and scientists attended, in order to familiarize themselves with the museum. One notable name in attendance was PZ Myers, who also came to experience the museum.

Since 2009, the SSA has held their Annual Leadership Conference over the Summer which aims to train student leaders and group members in leadership skills and grassroots organizing. In 2013, the conference was split into two locations (East and West).

Conferences
The SSA holds an annual leadership conference.

See also

 Equal Access Act
 List of secularist organizations
 Ryan J. Bell

References

Further reading
 Hibbard, Laura (July 17, 2012). "Teacher Allegedly Brags To JT Eberhard Of Secular Student Alliance That Atheist Student Group Was Blocked (PHOTO)". The Huffington Post. Retrieved 2012-08-13.
 Supiano, Beckie (February 27, 2011). "A Group for Secular Students Finds Its Way on a Christian Campus". The Chronicle of Higher Education. Retrieved 2012-08-13.
 
 
 Brunsman, August E (December 28, 2005). "A Brief History of the Secular Student Alliance". Secular Student Alliance. Retrieved 2012-08-13.

External links
 Secular Student Alliance website

Secularist organizations
Secularism in the United States
Student organizations established in 2001
Youth organizations based in the United States

Humanist associations
Freethought organizations
Freethought in the United States
Atheist organizations
Atheism in the United States
Nontheism
Irreligion in the United States
Disengagement from religion
Nonpartisan organizations in the United States
501(c)(3) organizations
Charities based in the United States
Non-profit organizations based in the United States
2001 establishments in the United States
Organizations established in 2001